Robert Whyte (January 6, 1787 – November 12, 1844) was a justice of the Tennessee Supreme Court from 1816 to 1834.

Born in Wigtonshire, Scotland, Whyte's parents intended for him to enter the ministry, and with that end in view he was highly educated at Edinburgh. He asked his parents permission to pursue a different professions, and when they refused, Whyte he emigrated to America. He reportedly taught for several years as a professor of languages in William and Mary College, although the accuracy of this account is disputed. He studied law, he went to North Carolina to practice, and having been licensed to practice law in Tennessee in September 1802, moved to Nashville, Tennessee, in 1804.

In May 1816, Whyte was appointed to the Tennessee Supreme Court to succeed John Overton. In October of the following year, Whyte "narrowly won election by the General Assembly to fill the seat", and then served until 1834, his eighteen year term of service being longest on the court to that point, and one rarely surpassed thereafter. During his tenure, Whyte was "one of the Court's foremost advocates of English law as providing guidance". His service on the court was describe by The Green Bag as follows:

On the reorganization of the court after the adoption of the Constitution of 1834, advancing years and the possession of what was then a large fortune disinclined him to further judicial work; and he retired.

References

Justices of the Tennessee Supreme Court
1787 births
1844 deaths
Scottish emigrants to the United States
U.S. state supreme court judges admitted to the practice of law by reading law
19th-century American judges